Depot Boijmans Van Beuningen (initially called 'het Collectiegebouw' (Collection Building), popularly called 'The Pot') is an art depot of Museum Boijmans Van Beuningen in Rotterdam. It is the first publicly accessible art depot in the world.

It is a 39.5 meter high, bowl-shaped building that is covered with reflective plates, so that a more or less contiguous, reduced mirror image of the environment can be seen, whereby one can look over the surrounding buildings. To guarantee the privacy of patients of the adjacent Erasmus MC, a number of plates have been made matt on that side. Some rooms where daylight is needed are also fitted with normal glass. An aluminum-coloured IKEA bowl served as inspiration for the shape of the building. The 'Blanda Blank', a slightly shiny serving dish made of stainless steel for 3.99 euros, happened to be on the table as a sugar bowl during preliminary discussions about the design for the building.

The first pile went into the ground on March 17, 2017. The building has seven floors. On the roof is a restaurant with 120 seats. The building contains 1 664 mirror panels with a combined surface of 6 609 m². In addition, there are four restoration studios. Inside, part of the collection is displayed in thirteen display cases. In October 2021, the costs for the building were estimated at over ninety million euros.

On November 5, 2015, the Rotterdam city council approved the change to the zoning plan in the Museum Park, allowing the plans for a special art depot to be realised. There used to be 255 Acacias trees on the site of the building. According to some experts, they were in a bad condition and could only survive if they were moved to the municipal tree depot. Others disagreed with that view, saying that the new building is destroying the park.

Depot Boijmans Van Beuningen was designed by the Dutch architectural firm MVRDV. The entire deposit collection of Museum Boijmans Van Beuningen (more than 151,000 objects housed together, arranged in fourteen storage compartments with five different climates) is stored here and is publicly accessible, on a total floor area of 15,541 m². Financially, the realization was made possible in part by the 'De Verre Bergen foundation' with a donation of €17 million and a loan of approximately €35 million during the construction phase.

The intention is that the exploitation will be paid for from entrance fees and from income from the rental of depot space to private art collectors; 15 percent of the floor space intended for art is reserved for this purpose.

On April 29, 2022, the Depot app received a Webby Award in the category Apps and Software, Art, Culture, and Events 2022. On 12 May 2022, the Depot received the Best Building award in the 'Stimulating Environments' category by the Dutch Architectural Firms Association (BNA).

References
Content in this edit is translated from the existing Dutch Wikipedia article at Depot Boijmans Van Beuningen; see its history for attribution.

Source
 Depot
 Stylish storage: world’s first publicly accessible art depot opens in Rotterdam. On: DutchNews.nl.

Museum Boijmans Van Beuningen
Art museums and galleries in the Netherlands
Modern art museums
Museums in Rotterdam
Buildings and structures in Rotterdam